The canton of Cernay is an administrative division of the Haut-Rhin department, northeastern France. Its borders were modified at the French canton reorganisation which came into effect in March 2015. Its seat is in Cernay.

It consists of the following communes:

Aspach-le-Bas
Aspach-Michelbach
Bitschwiller-lès-Thann
Bourbach-le-Bas
Bourbach-le-Haut
Cernay
Fellering
Geishouse
Goldbach-Altenbach
Husseren-Wesserling
Kruth
Leimbach
Malmerspach
Mitzach
Mollau
Moosch
Oderen
Rammersmatt
Ranspach
Roderen
Saint-Amarin
Schweighouse-Thann
Steinbach
Storckensohn
Thann
Uffholtz
Urbès
Vieux-Thann
Wattwiller
Wildenstein
Willer-sur-Thur

References

Cantons of Haut-Rhin